The British Academy of Film and Television Arts (BAFTA) Rising Star Award, currently styled as the EE Rising Star Award for commercial reasons and previously known as the Orange Rising Star Award, is an award that acknowledges new talents in the acting industry. The award was created after Mary Selway's death in 2004. She has been recognised for her successful role as a casting director and has helped many new actors and actresses to their claim to fame. The five nominees are chosen regardless of gender, nationality and whether they have made a breakthrough in television, film or both. Despite the nominees being chosen by the BAFTA juries, the winner is chosen entirely by public votes via text, internet or phone. This award was sponsored by Orange UK until 2012 and has been sponsored by EE since 2013. The first winner was James McAvoy in 2006. Eva Green, Shia LaBeouf and Kristen Stewart have been the only non-British winners. The current holder of the award is Emma Mackey, who won in 2023.

Winners and nominees

2000s

2010s

2020s

Notes

References

External links
The EE Rising Star Award at BAFTA

British Academy Film Awards
 
Awards for young actors